El Rincón is a corregimiento in Las Palmas District, Veraguas Province, Panama with a population of 2,574 as of 2010. Its population as of 1990 was 2,118; its population as of 2000 was 2,441.

References

Corregimientos of Veraguas Province